The 1969 Arizona State Sun Devils football team was an American football team that represented Arizona State University in the Western Athletic Conference (WAC) during the 1969 NCAA University Division football season. In their 12th season under head coach Frank Kush, the Sun Devils compiled an 8–2 record (6–1 against WAC opponents), won the WAC championship, and outscored their opponents by a combined total of 383 to 179.

The team's statistical leaders included Joe Spagnola with 1,488 passing yards, Dave Buchanan with 908 rushing yards, and Calvin Demery with 816 receiving yards.

Schedule

References

Arizona State
Arizona State Sun Devils football seasons
Western Athletic Conference football champion seasons
Arizona State Sun Devils football